Hugh IV of Saint-Pol (died March 1205 in Constantinople) from the House of Campdavaine, son of Anselm of Saint-Pol, was count of Saint-Pol from 1174 to his death, and lord of Demotika (Didymoteicho) in Thrace in 1204–05. He participated in the Third and Fourth Crusades.

Life 
He participated with Philip I, Count of Flanders, in the Third Crusade where he distinguished himself in the siege of Acre in 1191.

In 1194 he received from Philip II of France the lands of Pont-Sainte-Maxence, Verneuil and Pontpoint, because of his service.

In 1200 he enlisted in the Fourth Crusade, where his prior service and rank made him among the leading non-Venetian nobles: he came fourth after Boniface of Montferrat, Baldwin of Flanders, and Louis of Blois. He participated in the conquest of Constantinople on April 12, 1204. In an attempt to curb the pillaging of the city, he hanged one of his own knights. Hugh received the sword of constable by the new Latin Emperor, Baldwin of Flanders, who also gave him the fortress of Demotika in Thrace.

Hugh was married to Yolande, daughter of Baldwin IV, Count of Hainaut.  Hugh and Yolande had two daughters:
 Elizabeth (1179-1240), married first to Walter III, Seigneur de Châtillon-sur-Marne, and second to Jean de Béthune
 Eustache (1180-1241), married to  John de Nesle, Châtelain of Bruges (see House of Nesle).
He died of gout in 1205. He received a splendid funeral in Constantinople and his body was brought to France where he was buried in the Abbey of Cercamps.

References

Sources 

12th-century births
1205 deaths
Christians of the Third Crusade
Christians of the Fourth Crusade
Counts of Saint-Pol
History of Didymoteicho
Latin Empire people